The Hain Celestial Group, Inc. is an American food company whose main focus is natural foods and botanically-based personal care products. Its products range from herbal teas, sold by its Celestial Seasonings brand to snacks offered through its Terra brand as well as soaps, lotions, hair care, and body wash offered through their Jason, Alba, Live Clean, and Avalon Organic Brands. In May 2000, Hain Food Group merged with Celestial Seasonings, Inc. creating the current company.

Hain Daniels is its subsidiary in the United Kingdom.

History
The H. J. Heinz Company acquired 19.5% of the company in September 1999, but subsequently divested itself of all holdings in December 2005. On May 7, 2002, the company prior year periods had been restated by reclassifying promotional allowances and other sales incentives of $16.8 million in the third quarter of 2001. On January 13, 2014, the company acquired the rice company Tilda for $357 million. In 2015 the company acquired the non-dairy company Mona Naturprodukte Gmbh with its brand Joya.

In June 2018, Hain Celestial announced that CEO Irwin Simon would step down, becoming non executive chairman after a replacement is found.

Lawsuit
In November 2013, Hain Celestial became one of 25 companies targeted in an ongoing class action lawsuit regarding allegations of falsely labeling their personal care products (including Celestial Seasonings) as 'organic' under California law (California Products Act of 2003) to mislead consumers into purchasing them.

According to Glaucas Research Group and Eurofins, many of these products, including beverages, contain high levels of pesticide, far above federal limits of the United States. In September 2015, Hain Celestial Group reached a settlement and agreed to pay consumers a $7.5 million compensation for mislabeling their products with an additional $2.4 million worth of coupons.

Subsidiaries and brands

Beverages

 Celestial Seasonings
 Mountain Sun
 Rice Dream now divested
 Soy Dream now divested
 Almond Dream now divested 
 WestSoy now divested 
 Joya (European plant-based company)

Foods & Snacks

 ALBA 
 Casbah
 Earth's Best
 Ella's Kitchen 
 Empire Kosher
 Estee
 Ethnic Gourmet
 Europe's Best
 Frank Cooper's Oxford Marmalade
 FreeBird
 Garden of Eatin'
 Hain Pure Foods
 Hain Pure Snax
 Harry's Premium Snacks
 Health Valley
 Hollywood
 Imagine Foods
 Keiller's marmalade
 Lima
 Linda McCartney Foods
 Little Bear Snack Foods
 MaraNatha
 Milkfree, a sub brand of Natumi
 Natumi
 Nile Spice
 Rosetto
 Salt
 Sensible Portions
 Spectrum Essentials
 Spectrum Naturals
 Terra Chips
 That's How We Roll: ParmCrisps & Thinsters
 The Greek Gods
 Walnut Acres Organic
 Westbrae Natural
 Yves Veggie Cuisine

Personal Care 

 Alba Botanica
 Avalon Organics
 Batherapy
 Footherapy
 Heather's Naturals
 JĀSÖN Natural Products
 Live Clean
 Queen Helene

See also

List of food companies

References

External links 

List of brand names for Hain Celestial Group

1993 establishments in New York (state)
Food and drink companies of the United States
Companies based in Nassau County, New York
Companies listed on the Nasdaq